Rodolfo Halffter Escriche (October 20, 1900 – October 14, 1987) was a Spanish composer.

Early years
Born in Madrid, Spain, into a family of musicians, Rodolfo Halffter was the brother of Ernesto Halffter and uncle of Cristóbal Halffter, also composers. His father Ernest Halffter Hein came from Königsberg, Germany. His mother was Rosario Escriche Erradón, a Catalan who taught the first music lessons to her children.

Career
Rodolfo Hallfter was self-taught as a composer and in the 1930s took part in the intellectual environment of Madrid, particularly in the composers' society "Grupo de los Ocho" or "Grupo de Madrid". This group was influenced by Spanish musician Adolfo Salazar (1890-1958), who encouraged them to innovate and introduced them to the avant-garde music of the time, including the works of Debussy, Schoenberg, Ravel and Bartók. It was in this period that Halffter wrote the majority of his most important works, and at the same time he worked as a music critic in La Voz as well as in the propaganda ministry of the Republican government (as compared to his brother Ernesto, who supported Franco). Because of this relationship, he went into exile in Mexico at the end of the Spanish Civil War.

In Mexico he taught in the National Conservatory and was director of Ediciones Mexicanas de Música. He never quit composing and always kept the influence of the "Grupo de los Ocho". His works tend to develop in a free polytonality with a classicism in a Scarlatti style.  It is believed that Rodolfo Halffter brought serialism to Mexico.

Halffter returned to Spain on many occasions after 1963, teaching in Granada and Santiago de Compostela and taking part in music festivals.

He was awarded Spain's highest award for composition, the Premio Nacional de Música, in 1986.

He died in Mexico in 1987.

Selected filmography
 The Lady from Trévelez (1936)
 Michael Strogoff (1944)

References

Classical.com

1900 births
1987 deaths
Musicians from Madrid
Spanish people of German descent
Spanish composers
Spanish male composers
Spanish people of the Spanish Civil War (Republican faction)
Exiles of the Spanish Civil War in Mexico
Mexican people of German descent
Mexican people of Catalan descent
Academic staff of the National Conservatory of Music of Mexico
20th-century composers
20th-century Spanish musicians
20th-century Spanish male musicians